Nipponotrophon makassarensis is a species of sea snail, a marine gastropod mollusk in the family Muricidae, the murex snails or rock snails.

Description
The length of the shell attains 37.5 mm.

Distribution
This marine species occurs off Indonesia.

References

 Houart, R., 1985. Nipponotrophon makassarensis, a new recently dredged Muricidae species of strange generic affinities (Gastropoda: Muricidae). Marine Research in Indonesia 24("1984"): 83-87
 Houart, R., 1986. - Mollusca Gastropoda: Noteworthy Muricidae from the Pacific Ocean, with description of seven new species. Mémoires du Muséum national d'Histoire naturelle 133(A)("1985"): 427-455

Gastropods described in 1984
Nipponotrophon